This article lists feature-length British films and full-length documentaries that have had their premieres in 2016 and were at least partly made by Great Britain or the United Kingdom.  It does not feature short films, medium-length films, made-for-TV films, pornographic films, filmed theater, VR films and interactive films. It does not include films screened in previous years that had release dates in 2016.

Also included is an overview of the major events in British film, including film festivals and awards ceremonies, as well as a list of notable British film artists who died in 2016.

Film premieres

January – March

April – June

July – September

October – December

Other premieres

Culturally British Films
The following list comprises films not produced by Great Britain or the United Kingdom but is strongly associated with British culture. The films in this list should fulfill at least 3 of the following criteria:
 The film is adapted from a British source material.
 The story is set, at least partially, in the United Kingdom.
 The film was shot, at least partially, in the United Kingdom.
 Many of the film's cast and crew members are British.

British award winners 

Listed here are the British winners and nominees at the five most prestigious film award ceremonies in the English-speaking world: the Academy Awards, British Academy Film Awards, Critics' Choice Awards, Golden Globe Awards and Screen Actors Guild Awards, that were held during 2016, celebrating the best films of 2015. The British nominations were led by Room, Brooklyn, Carol and The Martian, with Ex Machina and 'The Danish Girl going on to win a number of technical awards, whilst Mark Rylance and Kate Winslet won multiple best supporting actor and supporting actress awards for Bridge of Spies and Steve Jobs, respectively. British films did, however, notably lose out to Spotlight and The Revenant from the United States, and Mad Max: Fury Road from Australia.

Academy Awards 
The 88th Academy Awards honoring the best films of 2015 were held on 28 February 2016.

British winners:
 Amy (Best Documentary – Feature)
 Ex Machina (Best Visual Effects)
 Room (Best Actress)
 Spectre (Best Original Song)
 Asif Kapadia (Best Documentary – Feature) – Amy
 James Gay-Rees (Best Documentary – Feature) – Amy
 Jenny Beavan (Best Costume Design) – Mad Max: Fury Road
 Jimmy Napes and Sam Smith (Best Original Song) – Writing's on the Wall from Spectre
 Mark Rylance (Best Supporting Actor) – Bridge of Spies
 Paul Norris (Best Visual Effects) – Ex Machina

British nominations:
 Brooklyn (Best Picture, Best Actress, Best Adapted Screenplay)
 The Danish Girl (Best Actor, Best Supporting Actress, Best Production Design, Best Costume Design)
  Fifty Shades of Grey (Best Original Song)
 The Martian (Best Picture, Best Actor, Best Adapted Screenplay, Best Sound Editing, Best Sound Mixing, Best Production Design, Best Visual Effects)
 Prologue (Best Animated Short Film)
 Room (Best Picture, Best Director, Best Adapted Screenplay)
 Shok (Best Live Action Short Film)
 Youth (Best Original Song)
 Adam Benzine (Best Documentary – Short Subject) – Claude Lanzmann: Spectres of the Shoah
 Alex Garland (Best Original Screenplay) – Ex Machina
 Andy Nelson (Best Sound Mixing) – Bridge of Spies and Star Wars: The Force Awakens
 Anohni (Best Original Song) – Racing Extinction
 Basil Khalil (Best Live Action Short Film) – Ave Maria
 Charlotte Rampling (Best Actress) – 45 Years
 Christian Bale (Best Supporting Actor) –  The Big Short
 Eddie Redmayne (Best Actor) – The Danish Girl
 Eve Stewart (Best Production Design) – The Danish Girl
 Imogen Sutton (Best Animated Short Film) – Prologue
 Jamie Donoughue (Best Live Action Short Film) – Shok
 Joshua Oppenheimer (Best Documentary – Feature) – The Look of Silence
 Kate Winslet (Best Supporting Actress) – Steve Jobs
 Mark Burton (Best Animated Feature Film) – Shaun the Sheep Movie
 Mark Taylor (Best Sound Mixing) – The Martian
 Matt Charman (Best Original Screenplay) – Bridge of Spies
 Michael Standish (Best Production Design) – The Danish Girl
 Nick Hornby (Best Adapted Screenplay) – Brooklyn
 Oliver Tarney (Best Sound Editing) – The Martian
 Paul Massey (Best Sound Mixing) – The Martian
 Richard Williams (Best Animated Short Film) – Prologue
 Roger Deakins (Best Cinematography) – Sicario
 Sandy Powell (Best Costume Design) – Carol and Cinderella
 Stuart Wilson (Best Sound Mixing) – Star Wars: The Force Awakens
 Tom Hardy (Best Supporting Actor) – The Revenant
 Tom Wood (Best Visual Effects) – Mad Max: Fury Road

British Academy Film Awards 

The 69th British Academy Film Awards honoring the best films of 2015 were held on 14 February 2016.

British winners:
 Amy (Best Documentary)
 Brooklyn (Outstanding British Film)
 Operator (Best Short Film)
 Room (Best Picture, Best Director, Best Adapted Screenplay)
 Theeb (Outstanding Debut by a British Writer, Director or Producer)
 Caroline Bartleet (Best Short Film) – Operator
 Chris Corbould (Best Special Visual Effects) – Star Wars: The Force Awakens
 Jenny Beavan (Best Costume Design) – Mad Max: Fury Road
 John Boyega (EE Rising Star Award)
 Kate Winslet (Best Actress in a Supporting Role) – Steve Jobs
 Mark Rylance (Best Actor in a Supporting Role) – Bridge of Spies
 Naji Abu Nowar and Rupert Lloyd (Outstanding Debut by a British Writer, Director or Producer) – Theeb
 Neal Scanlan (Best Special Visual Effects) – Star Wars: The Force Awakens
 Paul Kavanagh (Best Special Visual Effects) – Star Wars: The Force Awakens
 Roger Guyett (Best Special Visual Effects) – Star Wars: The Force Awakens
 Angels Costumes – Outstanding British Contribution to Cinema

British nominations:
 45 Years (Outstanding British Film)
 A Syrian Love Story – (Outstanding Debut by a British Writer, Director or Producer)
 Brooklyn (Best Actress in a Leading Role, Best Actress in a Supporting Role, Best Adapted Screenplay, Outstanding British Film)
 Carol (Best Film, Best Actress in a Leading Role, Best Actress in a Supporting Role, Best Adapted Screenplay, Best Cinematography)
 The Danish Girl (Best Actor in a Leading Role, Best Actress in a Leading Role, Outstanding British Film)
 Elephant (Best Short Film)
 Ex Machina (Best Actress in a Supporting Role, Best Original Screenplay, Outstanding British Film, Outstanding Debut by a British Writer, Director or Producer, Best Special Visual Effects)
 The Lady in the Van (Best Actress in a Leading Role)
 The Lobster – (Outstanding British Film)
 The Martian (Best Director, Best Actor in a Leading Role, Best Special Visual Effects)
 Room (Best Adapted Screenplay)
 Shaun the Sheep Movie (Best Animated Film)
 Steve Jobs (Best Actor in a Leading Role, Best Adapted Screenplay)
 The Survivalist (Outstanding Debut by a British Writer, Director or Producer)
 Theeb (Best Film Not in the English Language)
 Alex Garland (Best Original Screenplay, Outstanding Debut by a British Writer, Director or Producer) – Ex Machina
 Andy Nelson (Best Sound) – Bridge of Spies and Star Wars: The Force Awakens
 Bel Powley (EE Rising Star Award)
 Christian Bale (Best Supporting Actor) –  The Big Short
 Debbie Tucker Green (Outstanding Debut by a British Writer, Director or Producer) – Second Coming
 Eddie Redmayne (Best Actor in a Leading Role) – The Danish Girl
 Esther Smith (Best Short Film) – Elephant
 Idris Elba (Best Supporting Actor) – Beasts of No Nation
 Julie Walters (Best Actress in a Supporting Role) – Brooklyn
 Maggie Smith (Best Actress in a Leading Role) – The Lady in the Van
 Mark Burton (Best Animated Film) – Shaun the Sheep Movie
 Mark Ardington (Best Special Visual Effects) – Ex Machina
 Nick Helm (Best Short Film) – Elephant
 Paul Norris (Best Special Visual Effects) – Ex Machina
 Richard Starzak (Best Animated Film) – Shaun the Sheep Movie
 Ridley Scott (Best Director) – The Martian
 Roger Deakins (Best Cinematography) – Sicario
 Sandy Powell (Best Costume Design) – Carol and Cinderella
 Sean McAllister (Outstanding Debut by a British Writer, Director or Producer) – A Syrian Love Story
 Stephen Fingleton (Outstanding Debut by a British Writer, Director or Producer) – The Survivalist
 Stuart Wilson (Best Sound) – Star Wars: The Force Awakens
 Taron Egerton (EE Rising Star Award)

Critics' Choice Awards 
The 21st Critics' Choice Awards was held on 17 January 2016.

British winners:
 Amy (Best Documentary Feature)
 The Danish Girl (Best Supporting Actress)
 Ex Machina (Best Sci-Fi/Horror Movie)
 Room (Best Actress, Best Young Actor/Actress)
 Christian Bale (Best Actor in a Comedy)
 Jenny Beavan (Best Costume Design) – Mad Max: Fury Road
 Tom Hardy (Best Actor in an Action Movie) – Mad Max: Fury Road

British nominees:
 Brooklyn (Best Picture, Best Actress, Best Adapted Screenplay, Best Art Direction, Best Costume Design)
 Carol (Best Picture, Best Director, Best Actress, Best Supporting Actress, Best Art Direction, Best Costume Design, Best Costume Design, Best Score, Best Hair and Makeup)
 The Danish Girl (Best Actor, Best Art Direction, Best Costume Design, Best Hair and Makeup)
 Ex Machina (Best Original Screenplay, Best Visual Effects)
  Fifty Shades of Grey (Best Original Song)
 The Look of Silence (Best Documentary Feature)
 The Martian (Best Picture, Best Director, Best Actor, Best Adapted Screenplay, Best Sci-Fi/Horror Movie, Best Art Direction, Best Cinematography, Best Editing, Best Visual Effects)
 Room (Best Picture, Best Adapted Screenplay,
 Shaun the Sheep Movie (Best Animated Feature)
 Spectre (Best Actor in an Action Movie, Best Original Song)
 Writing's on the Wall from Spectre (Best Original Song)
 Steve Jobs (Best Actor, Best Supporting Actress)
 Simple Song#3"' from 'Youth (Best Original Song)
 Alex Garland (Best Original Screenplay) – Ex Machina
 Charlotte Rampling (Best Actress) – 45 Years
 Daniel Craig (Best Actor in an Action Movie) – Spectre
 Eddie Redmayne (Best Actor) – The Danish Girl
 Emily Blunt (Best Actress in an Action Movie) – Sicario)
 Eve Stewart (Best Production Design) – The Danish Girl
 Jason Statham (Best Actor in a Comedy) – Spy
 Helen Mirren (Best Supporting Actress) – Trumbo
 Kate Winslet (Best Supporting Actress) – Steve Jobs
 Mark Rylance (Best Supporting Actor) – Bridge of Spies
 Michael Standish (Best Production Design) – The Danish Girl
 Milo Parker (Best Young Actor/Actress) – Mr. Holmes
 Nick Hornby (Best Adapted Screenplay) – Brooklyn
 Ridley Scott (Best Director) – The Martian
 Roger Deakins (Best Cinematography) – Sicario
 Sandy Powell (Best Costume Design) – Carol and Cinderella
 Tom Hardy (Best Supporting Actor) – The Revenant

The 22nd Critics' Choice Awards was held on 11 December 2016.

British winners:
 Florence Foster Jenkins (Best Actress in a Comedy Movie)
 Andrew Garfield (Best Actor in an Action Movie) – Hacksaw Ridge

British nominees:
 A Monster Calls (Best Young Actor/Actress)
 Allied (Best Costume Design)
 Fantastic Beasts and Where to Find Them (Best Art Direction, Best Costume Design, Best Hair and Makeup, Best Visual Effects)
 Florence Foster Jenkins (Best Costume Design, Best Actor in a Comedy Movie)
 Hail, Caesar! (Best Comedy)
 Lion (Best Picture, Best Supporting Actor, Best Supporting Actress, Best Young Actor/Actress, Best Adapted Screenplay, Best Score)
 Loving (Best Picture, Best Actor, Best Actress, Best Original Screenplay)
 Andrew Garfield (Best Actor) – Hacksaw Ridge
 Anna Pinnock (Best Art Direction) – Fantastic Beasts and Where to Find Them
 David Mackenzie (Best Director) – Hell or High Water
 Hugh Grant (Best Actor) Florence Foster Jenkins
 Joanna Johnston (Best Costume Design) – Allied
 Joe Walker (Best Editing) – Arrival
 Kate Beckinsale (Best Actress in a Comedy Movie) – Love & Friendship
 Lewis MacDougall (Best Young Actor/Actress) – A Monster Calls
 Micachu (Best Original Score) – Jackie
 Stuart Craig (Best Art Direction) – Fantastic Beasts and Where to Find Them
 Tilda Swinton (Best ACtress in an Action Movie) – Doctor Strange

Golden Globe Awards 
The 73rd Golden Globe Awards was held on 10 January 2016.

British winners:
 The Martian (Best Best Motion Picture – Musical or Comedy, Best Performance in a Motion Picture – Drama)
 Room (Best Performance in a Motion Picture – Drama)
 Spectre (Best Original Song)
 Steve Jobs (Best Supporting Performance in a Motion Picture, Screenplay)
 Jimmy Napes (Best Original Song) – Writing's on the Wall from Spectre
 Sam Smith (Best Original Song) – Writing's on the Wall from Spectre

British nominees:
 Brooklyn (Best Performance in a Motion Picture – Drama)
 Carol (Best Motion Picture – Drama Best Performance in a Motion Picture – Drama, Best Director, Best Original Score)
 The Danish Girl (Best Performance in a Motion Picture – Drama, Best Original Score)
 Ex Machina (Best Supporting Performance in a Motion Picture)
  Fifty Shades of Grey (Best Original Song)
 The Lady in the Van (Best Performance in a Motion Picture – Musical or Comedy)
 Room (Best Motion Picture – Drama, Best Screenplay)
 Shaun the Sheep Movie (Best Animated Feature Film)
 Steve Jobs (Best Performance in a Motion Picture – Drama, Best Supporting Performance in a Motion Picture, Best Original Score)
 Youth (Best Original Song)
 Christian Bale (Best Supporting Performance in a Motion Picture) –  The Big Short
 Daniel Pemberton (Best Original Score) – Steve Jobs
 Eddie Redmayne (Best Performance in a Motion Picture – Drama) – The Danish Girl
 Maggie Smith (Best Performance in a Motion Picture – Musical or Comedy) – The Lady in the Van
 Mark Rylance (Best Supporting Performance in a Motion Picture) – Bridge of Spies
 Helen Mirren (Best Supporting Performance in a Motion Picture) – Trumbo
 Idris Elba (Best Supporting Performance in a Motion Picture) – Beasts of No Nation

Screen Actors Guild Awards 
The 22nd Screen Actors Guild Awards was held on 29 January 2016.

British winners:
 The Danish Girl (Outstanding Performance by a Female Actor in a Supporting Role)
 Room (Outstanding Performance by a Female Actor in a Leading Roles)
 Idris Elba (Outstanding Performance by a Male Actor in a Supporting Role) – Beasts of No Nation

British nominees:
 Brooklyn (Outstanding Performance by a Female Actor in a Leading Role)
 Carol (Outstanding Performance by a Female Actor in a Leading Role, Outstanding Performance by a Female Actor in a Supporting Role)
 The Danish Girl (Outstanding Performance by a Male Actor in a Leading Role)
 Everest (Outstanding Performance by a Stunt Ensemble in a Motion Picture)
 Room (Outstanding Performance by a Male Actor in a Supporting Role)
 Steve Jobs (Outstanding Performance by a Male Actor in a Leading Role, Outstanding Performance by a Female Actor in a Supporting Role)
 Adewale Akinnuoye-Agbaje (Outstanding Performance by a Cast in a Motion Picture) – Trumbo
 Christian Bale (Outstanding Performance by a Male Actor in a Supporting Role) –  The Big Short
 Eddie Redmayne (Outstanding Performance by a Male Actor in a Leading Role) – The Danish Girl
 Helen Mirren (Outstanding Performance by a Female Actor in a Supporting Role) – Trumbo, (Outstanding Performance by a Female Actor in a Leading Role) – Woman in Gold
 Idris Elba (Outstanding Performance by a Cast in a Motion Picture) – Beasts of No Nation
 Mark Rylance (Outstanding Performance by a Male Actor in a Supporting Role) – Bridge of Spies
 Rafe Spall (Outstanding Performance by a Cast in a Motion Picture) –  The Big Short

Deaths

See also 
 Lists of British films
 2016 in film
 2016 in British music
 2016 in British radio
 2016 in British television
 2016 in the United Kingdom
 List of 2016 box office number-one films in the United Kingdom
 List of British films of 2015
 List of British films of 2017

References

External links
 

2016
British